Naktsang is a town in Haa District in southwestern Bhutan. (Do not confuse with Naktsang Town in Shentsa County, Tibet.)

Footnotes

References
 Dorje, Gyurme. Footprint Tibet Handbook. 4th Edition. (2009) Bath, U.K.

External links
Satellite map at Maplandia.com

Populated places in Bhutan